The National Library of Australia (NLA), formerly the Commonwealth National Library and Commonwealth Parliament Library, is the largest reference library in Australia, responsible under the terms of the National Library Act 1960 for "maintaining and developing a national collection of library material, including a comprehensive collection of library material relating to Australia and the Australian people", thus functioning as a national library. It is located in Parkes, Canberra, ACT.

Created in 1960 by the National Library Act, by the end of June 2019 its collection contained 7,717,579 items, with its manuscript material occupying  of shelf space. The NLA also hosts and manages the renowned Trove cultural heritage discovery service, which includes access to the Australian Web Archive and National edeposit (NED), a large collection of digitised newspapers, official documents, manuscripts and images, as well as born-digital material.

History
In 1901 the Commonwealth Parliament Library was established to serve the newly formed Federal Parliament of Australia. From its inception the Commonwealth Parliamentary Library was driven to development of a truly national collection. In 1907 the Joint Parliamentary Library Committee under the Chairmanship of the Speaker, Sir Frederick William Holder defined the objective of the Commonwealth Parliamentary Library in the following words:

The Library Committee is keeping before it the ideal of building up, for the time when Parliament shall be established in the Federal Capital, a great Public Library on the lines of the world-famed Library of Congress at Washington; such a library, indeed, as shall be worthy of the Australian Nation; the home of the literature, not of a State, or of a period, but of the world, and of all time.

From 1923, two forms of name were used concurrently: Commonwealth National Library and Commonwealth Parliament Library, to designate the national and parliamentary collections respectively.

In 1960 the National Library of Australia was created by the National Library Act 1960, and each library became a separate entity.

Building
The present library building was opened on 15 August 1968 by Prime Minister John Gorton. The building was designed by the architectural firm of Bunning and Madden in the Late Twentieth Century Stripped Classical style. The foyer is decorated in marble, with stained-glass windows by Leonard French and three tapestries by Mathieu Matégot. The building was listed on the Australian Commonwealth Heritage List on 22 June 2004. A Tom Bass sculpture called Lintel Sculpture is installed over the entrance to the library.

In 2004 the book "A different view : the National Library of Australia and its building art" was published which talked about the NLA building.

Reading rooms
The large National Library building is home to various reading rooms and collections. On the ground floor is the Main Reading Room — this is where the bulk of the Library's Internet access terminals are located, and where wireless internet access is available. Services are also delivered on-site from the Newspaper & Family History zone on the ground floor, the Special Collections Reading Room and the Petherick Reading Room on the 1st floor, and Asian Collections on level 3.

Collections

Australian & General Collection
The Library collects material produced by Australians, for Australians or about the Australian experience in all formats—not just printed works—books, serials, newspapers, maps, posters, music and printed ephemera—but also online publications and unpublished material such as manuscripts, pictures and oral histories. Hazel de Berg began recording Australian writers, artists, musicians and others in the Arts community in 1957. She conducted nearly 1300 interviews. Together with the Library, she was a pioneer in the field in Australia, working together for twenty-seven years.

A core Australiana collection is that of John A. Ferguson.  The Library has particular collection strengths in the performing arts, including dance.

The Library contains a considerable collection of general overseas and rare book materials, as well as world-class Asian and Pacific collections which augment the Australiana collections. The print collections are further supported by extensive microform holdings.

The Library also maintains the National Reserve Braille Collection.

As a national library, the NLA is required by legal deposit provisions enshrined in the Copyright Act 1968 to collect a copy of every Australian publication in the country, which publishers must submit upon publication of the material.

At the end of the Australian financial year of 2018–2019, the National Library collection comprised 7,717,579 items, and an additional  of manuscript material. The Library's collections of Australiana have developed into the nation's single most important resource of materials recording the Australian cultural heritage. Australian writers, editors and illustrators are actively sought and well represented, whether published in Australia or overseas.

The Library's collection includes all formats of material, from books, journals, websites and manuscripts to pictures, photographs, maps, music, oral history recordings, manuscript papers and ephemera.

Approximately 94.1% of the Library's collection had been catalogued by July 2019, a total of 5,453,888 items and these are discoverable through the online catalogue.

Digital collections
The Library is a world leader in digital preservation techniques, and has maintained an Internet-accessible archive of selected Australian websites called the Pandora Archive since 1996. The Australian Web Archive, released in March 2019, combines records from PANDORA, the Australian Government Web Archive (AGWA), and other websites published in Australia. In the 2019 federal budget, the government allocated  million to the library, intended to be spread over four years to set up a digitisation fund.

, the Library had digitised a total of 5,508,008 images. Where possible, these are delivered directly across the Internet.

Since a 2016 amendment to the Copyright Act, all born-digital content must also be deposited in the library (with varying provisions for state libraries as well). The NLA has since May 2019 hosted and managed the National edeposit (NED) service. Libraries ACT, Libraries Tasmania, Northern Territory Library, State Library of New South Wales, State Library of Queensland, State Library of South Australia, State Library Victoria and the State Library of Western Australia are the member organisations of the collaboration.

Asian Collections
The Library houses the largest and most actively developing research resource on Asia in Australia, and the largest Asian language collections in the Southern hemisphere, with over half a million volumes in the collection, as well as extensive online and electronic resources. The Library collects resources about all Asian countries in Western languages extensively, and resources in the following Asian languages: Burmese, Chinese, Persian, Indonesian, Japanese, Khmer, Korean, Lao, Manchu, Mongolian, Thai, Timorese, and Vietnamese.

The Library has acquired a number of important Western and Asian language scholarly collections from researchers and bibliophiles. These collections include:

 Australian Buddhist Library Collection
 Braga Collection (Portuguese in Asia)
 Claasz Collection (Sri Lanka)
 Coedes Collection (Indo-China)
 London Missionary Society Collection (China)
 Luce Collection (Burma)
 McLaren-Human Collection (Korea)
 Otley Beyer Collection (Philippines)
 Sakakibara Collection (Japan)
 Sang Ye Collection (China)
 Simon Collection (East Asia)
 Harold S. Williams Collection (Japan)

The Asian Collections are searchable via the National Library's catalogue.

Pictures and manuscripts

The National Library holds an extensive collection of pictures and manuscripts. The manuscript collection contains about 26 million separate items, covering in excess of 10,492 meters of shelf space (ACA Australian Archival Statistics, 1998). The collection relates predominantly to Australia, but there are also important holdings relating to Papua New Guinea, New Zealand and the Pacific. The collection also holds a number of European and Asian manuscript collections or single items have been received as part of formed book collections.

The Australian manuscript collections date from the period of maritime exploration and settlement in the 18th century until the present, with the greatest area of strength dating from the 1890s onwards. The collection includes a large number of outstanding single items, such as the 14th century Chertsey Cartulary, the journal of James Cook on HM Bark Endeavour, inscribed on the Memory of the World Register in 2001, the diaries of Robert O'Hara Burke and William John Wills from the Burke and Wills expedition, and Charles Kingsford Smith's and Charles Ulm's log of the Southern Cross.

A wide range of individuals and families are represented in the collection, with special strength in the fields of politics, public administration, diplomacy, theatre, art, literature, the pastoral industry and religion. Examples are the papers of Alfred Deakin, Sir John Latham, Sir Keith Murdoch, Sir Hans Heysen, Sir John Monash, Vance Palmer and Nettie Palmer, A.D. Hope, Manning Clark, David Williamson, W.M. Hughes, Sir Robert Menzies, Sir William McMahon, Lord Casey, Geoffrey Dutton, Peter Sculthorpe, Daisy Bates, Jessie Street, and Eddie Mabo and James Cook both of whose papers were inscribed on UNESCO's Memory of the World Programme Register in 2001.

The Library has also acquired the records of many national non-governmental organisations. They include the records of the Federal Secretariats of the Liberal party, the A.L.P, the Democrats, the R.S.L., the Australian Inland Mission, the Australian Union of Students, The Australian Ballet, the Australian Elizabethan Theatre Trust, the Australian Institute of Urban Studies, Australian Industries Protection League, the Australian Conservation Foundation, and the Australian Council of National Trusts. Finally, the Library holds about 37,000 reels of microfilm of manuscripts and archival records, mostly acquired overseas and predominantly of Australian and Pacific interest.

The National Library's Pictures collection focuses on Australian people, places and events, from European exploration of the South Pacific to contemporary events. Art works and photographs are acquired primarily for their informational value, and for their importance as historical documents.

Media represented in the collection include photographs, drawings, watercolours, oils, lithographs, engravings, etchings and sculpture/busts.

Services
The National Library of Australia provides a national leadership role in developing and managing collaborative online services with the Australian library community, making it easier for users to find and access information resources at the national level. It provides services to libraries and publishers and the general public, with membership available to residents of Australia providing access to additional services.

Some of the components of the services are:
For publishers:
Prepublication Data Service, ISSNs and ISMNs for Australian publishers.
National edeposit (NED), to fulfill legal deposit obligations. NLA hosts and manages the service, whereby all born-digital content published in Australia, as required by legal deposit legislation under the Copyright Act 1968, is deposited remotely by the publisher, stored and made accessible to member libraries and the public.
For librarians:
The Australian National Bibliographic Database (ANBD) and offers free access through the Libraries Australia subscription-based service. It is used for reference, collection development, cataloguing and interlibrary lending.
National Libraries Gateway.
Online, for the general public:
The Australian Web Archive, which now incorporates PANDORA (established 1996), the Australian Government Web Archive (AWA) and the ".au" domain archive. 
 National Library of Australia Catalogue, a catalogue of resources in NLA which are available to the general public.

Trove

The online services mentioned above, and more, are accessible via the Trove service, which was launched in 2009. Trove is an online library database aggregator, a centralised national service built with the collaboration of major libraries of Australia. Trove's most well known feature is the digitised collection of Australian newspapers. Most NLA resource discovery services are now fully integrated with Trove. The service is able to locate resources about Australia and Australians, which reaches many locations otherwise unavailable to external search engines.

Publishing 
The library produces non-fiction and children's books which explore the collections. These cover subjects including History, Natural History and Art. NLA Publishing has been a recipient of several Eve Pownall Award for Information Books.

Membership
Free registration with the library is allowed for all Australian residents, with cards sent to a physical address before use is allowed. Membership confers some extra benefits for users of the library, such as requesting items for use onsite in the reading rooms, and access to a select range of licensed electronic resources from offsite, such as the full text of Encyclopaedia Britannica. Electronic copies of some items are able to be ordered, and for members who can visit the library in person, inter-library loans may be obtained to use in the reading rooms.

Directors-General

The following individuals have been appointed as Director-General or any precedent titles:

Funding problems
In 2016, with threatened funding cuts to Trove, a public campaign led to a government commitment of  million in December 2016, spread over four years.

By early 2020, with the surge in demand for all types of digital services, the National Library was having to cope with increasingly dwindling staff resources to develop services on Trove and National edeposit, and undertook a restructure of its staffing and operations.

See also

 List of national and state libraries
 National and State Libraries Australia 
 Parliamentary Triangle, Canberra
 Parliamentary Library of Australia

References

Attribution

Bibliography

External links

 National Library of Australia
 National Library of Australia Catalogue
 NLA Publishing
 National Library Act 1960 
 Australian Libraries Gateway
 Australian Interlibrary Resource Sharing Directory
 Electronic Resources Australia (ERA)
 NLA Preservation Policy 
 Trove
 National Library of Australia National Library of Australia, Trove, People and Organisation record for National Library of Australia
 Commonwealth National Library (Australia) National Library of Australia, Trove, People and Organisation record for Commonwealth National Library (Australia)
 Commonwealth Parliament Library (Australia) National Library of Australia, Trove, People and Organisation record for Commonwealth Parliament Library (Australia)

 
1960 establishments in Australia
Archives in Australia
Commonwealth Government agencies of Australia
Libraries in Canberra
Australia
Libraries established in 1960
Tourist attractions in Canberra
Deposit libraries
Sound archives in Australia
Art museums and galleries in Australia
Museums in Canberra
Music archives
Music museums in Australia
Library buildings completed in 1968
Commonwealth Heritage List places in the Australian Capital Territory
Articles containing video clips
Research libraries in Australia